Volusia County Schools is the public school district for Volusia County, Florida, United States. The district serves the 16 cities of Daytona Beach, DeBary, DeLand, DeLeon Springs, Deltona, Edgewater, Enterprise, Holly Hill, Lake Helen, New Smyrna Beach, Oak Hill, Orange City, Ormond Beach, Osteen, Pierson, and Port Orange. It is the 57th largest school district in the United States and serves approximately 63,000 students. The district is composed of 45 elementary schools, 12 middle schools, and 9 high schools. In addition there are 9 alternative schools, 7 charter schools, 2 combination schools (K-8 or 6-12), and 1 district virtual instruction program. The district is accredited by the Southern Association of Colleges and Schools/AdvancED.

Leadership
Volusia County Schools is led by Superintendent Dr. Carmen Balgobin and five elected members of the school board, one from each district in the county.
 Linda Cuthbert, Chairman, School Board Member, District No. 3
 Jamie Haynes, Vice Chairman, School Board Member, District No. 1
 Anita Burnette, School Board Member, District No. 2
 Carl Persis, School Board Member, District No. 4
 Ruben Colón, School Board Member, District No. 5

Elementary schools

 Beachside Elementary
 Blue Lake Elementary
 Champion Elementary (formerly Hurst)
 Chisholm Elementary
 Citrus Grove Elementary
 Coronado Beach Elementary
 Cypress Creek Elementary
 DeBary Elementary
 Deltona Lakes Elementary
 Discovery Elementary
 Edgewater Public
 Edith I. Starke Elementary
 Enterprise Elementary
 Forest Lake Elementary
 Freedom Elementary
 Friendship Elementary
 Holly Hill School (K-8)
 Horizon Elementary
 Indian River Elementary
 Manatee Cove Elementary
 George W. Marks Elementary
 Louise S. McInnis Elementary
 Orange City Elementary
 Ormond Beach Elementary
 Osceola Elementary
 Osteen Elementary
 Palm Terrace Elementary
 Pathways Elementary
 Pierson Elementary
 Pine Trail Elementary
 Port Orange Elementary
 Pride Elementary
 R. J. Longstreet Elementary
 Read-Pattillo Elementary
 South Daytona Elementary
 Spirit Elementary
 Spruce Creek Elementary
 Sugar Mill Elementary
 Sunrise Elementary
 Sweetwater Elementary
 Timbercrest Elementary
 Tomoka Elementary
 Turie T. Small Elementary
 Volusia Pines Elementary
 Westside Elementary
 Woodward Avenue Elementary

Middle schools

High schools

Charter schools
 Burns Science and Technology Charter School (K-8)
 Easter Seals Charter School (Pre-K)
 Ivy Hawn Charter School of the Arts (K-8)
 Richard Milburn Academy (9-12)
 Richard Milburn Academy West (9-12)
 Samsula Academy (K-5)
 The Chiles Academy (6-12)
 The Reading Edge Academy (K-5)
 Legacy Scholars Academy (6-12)

Alternative education
 AMIkids
 Department of Juvenile Justice Educational Programs
 Highbanks Learning Center
 PACE Center for Girls
 Riverview Learning Center

References

External links 
 vcsedu.org, Home Page
 GreatSchools.org

School districts in Florida
Education in Volusia County, Florida
Deltona, Florida
Port Orange, Florida